Twisted Love may refer to:
"Twisted Love", book by Ana Huang
Twisted Love (album), The Quireboys 2016
"Twisted Love", song by The Quireboys from Twisted Love (album) 2016
"Twisted Love", song by ATB from Distant Earth
"Twisted Love", song by Ruben Studdard from Letters from Birmingham
Twisted Love, 1995 film with Sasha Jenson and Soleil Moon Frye
Twisted Love, also Twisted Passion (现代豪放女 Xiandai haofang nu), 1985 Hong Kong film with Charlie Cho
Twisted Love, a 2020 reality television series on Investigation Discovery